Asror is a masculine given name. Notable people with the name include:

Asror Aliqulov (born 1978), Uzbekistani footballer
Asror Vohidov (born 1995), Tajikistani boxer

See also
Astor (surname)

Masculine given names